Rafael Mateos (born 23 February 1976) is a Spanish racing cyclist. He rode in the 2000 Tour de France.

References

1976 births
Living people
Spanish male cyclists
Place of birth missing (living people)